Heath Park could refer to:

Heath Park (Brisbane), Australia
Heath Park, a large park in Heath, Cardiff, Wales
Heath Park, Barking and Dagenham, London, England
Heath Park, Havering, London, England
Heath Park Halt railway station, a former station in Hertfordshire, England
Heath Park School, Wolverhampton, England